The Exmormon Foundation is a non-profit, non-sectarian organization that supports people transitioning out of affiliation with the Church of Jesus Christ of Latter-day Saints (LDS Church). It was founded by Richard Packham in 2001. He left the LDS Church after concluding from his personal research that he did not believe its teachings, particularly the historical teachings of the Adam–God doctrine.

The foundation holds an annual conference in Salt Lake City, Utah in October, the same month as one of the LDS Church's own semi-annual general conferences. Notable speakers at the Exmormon Foundation Conference have included musician Tal Bachman, Flora Jessop and Linda Walker of the Child Protection Project, Dr. Simon Southerton, Brent Lee Metcalfe, Steven Hassan, Stanford professor Craig Criddle, Jeff Sharlet, John Larsen, Grant H. Palmer, John Dehlin, and Pat Bagley.

The Exmormon Foundation is informally associated with the Recovery from Mormonism website, which hosts a discussion board where Exmormons, unbelieving Mormons, and doubters post their complaints, criticisms, and other personal reactions to their experience with the LDS Church. The Recovery from Mormonism website also includes a catalog of short auto-biographies where Exmormons describe their loss of faith in Mormonism. Mormon scholars like Daniel C. Peterson have been known to post on the Recovery from Mormonism discussion board in defense of their religion.

References

External links
 Exmormon Foundation

Critics of Mormonism
Latter Day Saint organizations
Latter Day Saint movement in Utah